IHT may refer to:

International Herald Tribune newspaper
Intermittent hypoxic training
Inheritance Tax in the United Kingdom
Institution of Highways and Transportation, former name of UK Chartered Institution of Highways and Transportation
IHT Records
Institute of Health Technology, Rajshahi, Sylhet, Dhaka, Bogra, of Bangladesh